This is a list of deaths of notable people, organised by year. New deaths articles are added to their respective month (e.g.,  Deaths in ) and then linked here.

2023

2022

2021

2020

2019

2018

2017

2016

2015

2014

2013

2012

2011

2010

2009

2008

2007

2006

2005

2004

2003

2002

2001

2000

1999 
1999

1998 
1998

1997 
1997

1996 
1996

1995 
1995

1994 
1994

1993 
1993

1992 
1992

1991 
{{Main|1991

1990 
{{Main|1990

1989 
{{Main|1989

1988 
{{Main|1988

1987 
{{Main|1987

1986 
{{Main|1986

1985 
{{Main|1985

1984 
{{Main|1984

1983 
{{Main|1983

1982 
{{Main|1982

1981 
{{Main|1981

1980 
{{Main|1980

See also 
 Lists of deaths by day
 Deaths by year